A  is a bolt of traditional Japanese narrow-loomed cloth. It is used to make traditional Japanese clothes, textile room dividers, sails, and other traditional cloth items.

One kimono takes one  of cloth to make.  are woven in the narrow widths most ergonomic for a single weaver (at a handloom without a flying shuttle).

Fibers 

 may be woven of a variety of fibers, including silk, wool, hemp, linen and cotton. Polyester is also popular, as it is easy to wash at home.

In the Jomon period (8000–300BC) people made twined textiles from a variety of bast fibers from wild plants. Wild fibers include the inner bark of wild trees or shrubs, and grass fibers.

Between the 2nd and 3rd centuries BC, immigrants from the mainland began using the domesticated long-stapled ramie plant. Silk was also known at this time, but used only by the upper classes. Paper was developed in the 3rd and 4th century AD, and woven textiles including paper fibers likely began to be woven around the 5th and 6th century AD, though there is little early record.

In the 7th and 8th century AD, Tang-dynasty immigrants brought new production techniques for textiles, and Japanese silk weaving improved.

In the 1400s, cotton was introduced from Korea. Cotton did not become widely available throughout Japan until the mid-1700s; commoners continued to rely on wild and cultivated bast fibers. Working-class fabrics were mostly made of hemp or ramie. Cotton was more expensive, especially outside the western regions of Japan, where it was grown. Second-hand cotton cloth was, however, sold to rural farmers outside these areas, and was preferred over hemp fabric for its softness and heat-retaining properties. Weaving was largely a cottage industry until cotton cloth was first machine-made in Japan in the 1870s.  are now often machine-woven.

 ('paper-child') is a soft, flexible paper with cotton or silk attached to the reverse side. It is highly thermally-insulating.

, a bright, crisp, durable fabric machine-made from silk noil, was first made in the late 19th century and became extremely popular in the 1920s and 1930s. Wool, especially merino, was introduced in the same periods and widely worn.

Rayon started to be widely used in the 1920s; early rayon was made using the cupro process, which is still used in one factory in Japan . Though improvements to the rayon production process significantly improved the durability of late-20th-century rayon, early Japanese rayon fabrics are known for their poorer durability, being more prone to age-related degradation, due to fibres being weakened when brought into contact with water.  Most rayon is now produced using the viscose process, which uses toxic carbon disulfide. Carbon disulfide emissions are declining for rayon produced in Japan, but in major producing countries, they are uncontrolled and unknown, as is their health toll.

List of fibers

Weaves 

They use twisted warps.

 (pattern weaving) includes patterning by varying the weave and patterning by weaving with variably-dyed threads.

Weaving, dimensions and use 

 are woven narrow instead of being cut to a narrow width, with both vertical edges being selvages.

Hand-woven and handspun  are still made in Japan, but they are much more expensive, and the industry is in decline. Traditionally an article of thrift,  are now expensive informal pieces of clothing, prized for their limited production and craftsmanship.

Although modern  are mostly machine-woven, the narrow width of most  remains a standard of production. Modern Western fabrics, and traditional fabrics made on automatic looms, are typically much wider; they are less commonly used for kimono production. Wider , and more commonly longer , are also occasionally sold for kimono production; some of these are woven larger to accommodate larger figures, with longer  typically being used to produce a matching kimono,  and  set for men. A second set of kimono sleeves could also be produced, so that a kimono could feature either regular short sleeves or long sleeves.

In approximately the Meiji period (1868–1912), the bolt length for kimono was standardized.

Otherwise, the patterns would be spaced so that it was in the right place relative to where the cloth would be cut (for instance, so that a kimono's hem patterns were located at the hem on all body panels).

The garment's seam width is adjusted so that the finished garment fits the person, instead of cutting the cloth narrower. Excess is folded under and hemmed, not cut off. Sewn tucks are taken in children's clothing, and let out as the child grows.

A garment made from a  can be disassembled for cleaning (typically for more expensive or formal kimono), re-dyeing, and repairs; it may also be disassembled to rotate the pieces for more even wear, or to be re-sized. When the cloth is worn out, it may be used as fabric for smaller items or to create  (patchwork) futons or garments. The fact that the pattern pieces of a kimono consist of rectangles, and not complex shapes, make reuse in other items or garments easier. Patchwork garments were very popular in the 1500s, and are traditionally worn by Buddhist monks as vestments. The cloth used for patchwork clothing must all be of similar weight, elasticity, and stiffness.

Decoration 

 are decorated with a variety of techniques, either in the weaving process, through embroidery, dyework, a combination of techniques or others, such as appliqué.

The decorative technique used on or while constructing the fabric generally designates its end use. For kimono, designs dyed into the fibres and yarns used for weaving before the fabric's construction, including ikat dyeing, are considered informal, with designs dyed into the fabric after weaving and embroidered designs used for more formal kimono. For , woven patterns are conversely considered the most formal, with designs dyed onto the fabric and embroidered designs paired with less formal kimono.

For less formal kimono, the pattern is drawn and applied to the fabric before it is cut and constructed, as the design is not intended to match up over the seams, or the kimono will have a solid colour.  kimono use a non-reversible pattern laid out with respect to where the cuts will fall, but no seam-crossing patterns.

Designs for children's clothing were not distinguishably gender-specific until the end of the 1700s.

Traditionally,  would be dyed and even woven to order; though kimono are still mostly made to order,  are now commonly bought ready-made to be sewn later. Modern  for less formal kimono are often dyed with inkjet printers, though formal kimono are more likely to be dyed by hand.

Most ikat-woven, indigo-dyed cotton fabrics – known as  – were historically hand-woven by the working classes, who of necessity spun and wove their own clothing until cheaper ready-to-wear clothing became widely available. Indigo, being the cheapest and easiest-to-grow dyestuff available to many, used due to its specific dye qualities; a weak indigo dyebath could be used several times over to build up a hard-wearing colour, whereas other dyestuffs would be unusable after one round of dyeing. Working-class families commonly produced books of hand-woven fabric samples known as  – literally, "stripe book", as many fabrics were woven with stripes – which would then be used as a dowry for young women and as a reference for future weaving. With the introduced of ready-to-wear clothing, the necessity of weaving one's own clothes died out, leading to many of these books becoming heirlooms instead of working reference guides.  are one-sided, and also often feature ikat-dyed designs of stripes, checks and arrows, commonly using indigo dyestuff.

is a figured silk fabric, typically with figurative or geometric motifs. As the pattern is made by varying the texture of the weave, it can be additionally decorated with dyed or embroidered patters.

Resist dyeing 

Techniques such as resist-dyeing are commonly used. These techniques range from intricate  tie-dye to rice paste resist-dyeing ( etc.).

Though hand-applied resist dyeing on high-end kimono is used so that different colours of dye can be hand-applied within the open spaces left, for rural clothes and fabrics,  was often applied to plain cloth before it was repeatedly dipped in an indigo dye vat, leading to the iconic appearance of white-and-indigo rural clothes, with rice paste sometimes applied over previously open areas to create areas of lighter blue on a darker indigo background.

Tie-dye and clamping techniques 

This was a common technique in the Muromachi period, and was revived in the 20th century by Japanese dye artist Itchiku Kubota. Due to the time-consuming nature of producing  fabrics and the small pool of artists possessing knowledge of the technique, only some varieties are still produced, and brand-new  kimono are exceedingly expensive to buy.

List of decoration types

See also 
 , a spirit-possessed, animate  which flies through the air, especially at night.
 Traditional colors of Japan, colours traditionally used in Japanese textiles
 , a type of silk fabric seen in early mass-produced .
 Bolt (cloth)#Unit, for European equivalents

Garments and other cloth items 
 Kimono
 , the predecessor to the kimono
 , a type of traditional dividing screen made of fabric
 , a type of door curtain

Regional varieties of  

 , a banana-fiber cloth from Kijōka, Oshinawa
 , a black-brown -dyed slub silk from Kumejima, Okinawa
 , a -dyed ramie cloth from Miyakojima, Okinawa
 , fabric traditionally woven in the Nishijin district of Kyoto
 , a brocade from Saga with a treated-paper warp
 , a -dyed slub silk from Yūki, Ibaraki

Notes

References

External links 

 Handbook for the Appreciation of Japanese Traditional Craft: TEXTILES, DYEING & WEAVING 2004/09/10

Japanese words and phrases
Textile arts of Japan